DAMP is a solution stack of computer software, usually free software or open-source software, that is used to run dynamic Web sites or servers running the Darwin operating system.  The  acronym is derived from the original acronym LAMP.  The expansion is as follows:
Darwin, referring to the Darwin operating system that underlies Mac OS X
Apache, the Web server
MySQL, the database management system (or database server)
PHP, the web application-oriented programming language

References

External links 
DAMP MacPorts Tutorial

Web frameworks
Web server software
PHP